The A5126 is an A road in Cheshire, starting at Halton Lodge and finishing at Beechwood. The road is also sometimes known as Weston Expressway. It begins on the A533, where the changeover between the Southern Expressway and Central Expressway occurs. Its short length means that most map sources show it as a spur of either of the A533 or A557.

Roads in England
Cheshire